The 1960–61 Chicago Black Hawks season was the Hawks' 35th season in the National Hockey League (NHL), ending with the Hawks winning their third Stanley Cup. Chicago faced the Montreal Canadiens in the NHL semi-finals, and defeated the Canadiens in six games to reach their first Stanley Cup Finals in 17 years. They subsequently faced the Detroit Red Wings in the Stanley Cup Finals, winning in six games. However, it would be their last Stanley Cup championship for 49 years.

Regular season
The Black Hawks started the year off very strong, earning a 6–1–2 record in their first nine games; however, the club went into a slump in which their record was 5–13–6 in their next 24 games, causing them to fall under the .500 mark and into a battle with the Detroit Red Wings and New York Rangers for a playoff spot. Chicago would snap out of their slump, and go on a seven-game winning streak to sit with an 18–14–8 record, 40 games into the season. The Hawks continued to play good hockey for the remainder of the season, going 11–10–9 in their last 30 games to finish the season with a club-record 29 victories and 75 points. The Hawks finished in third place for the third consecutive season, and for the first time since 1945–46 the club finished the season with a record over .500.

Offensively, Chicago was led by Bill Hay, who led the team with 48 assists and 59 points, while Bobby Hull scored a team-high 31 goals. Stan Mikita had a break out season, scoring 19 goals and 53 points, as did Murray Balfour, who had 21 goals and 48 points. On defense, Pierre Pilote led the way, scoring 6 goals and 35 points while posting a team-high 165 penalty minutes.

In goal, Glenn Hall played in all 70 games, winning a team-record 29 games, while posting a 2.51 GAA and 6 shutouts.

Season standings

Record vs. opponents

Schedule and results

Playoffs
Chicago faced the Montreal Canadiens in the best-of-seven NHL semi-final for the third consecutive season. The Canadiens once again finished on top of the NHL, earning 92 points, and had won five straight Stanley Cup championships. The heavily favored Canadiens took the series opener at the Montreal Forum, easily defeating Chicago 6–2; however, the Black Hawks fought back in the second game, evening the series out with a 4–3 win. The series moved to Chicago Stadium for the next two games, and the Black Hawks used their home ice advantage to take a 2–1 series lead with a thrilling 2–1 overtime victory in the third game; however, the powerful Canadiens stormed back in the fourth game, defeating Chicago 5–2 to even the series up once again. The Black Hawks stunned the Montreal fans in the fifth game, shutting out the Canadiens 3–0 on the road to return to Chicago for the sixth game up 3–2 in the series. Chicago completed the upset, once again shutting out the Canadiens 3–0 in the sixth game to win the series 4–2, and earned a trip to the Stanley Cup finals for the first time since 1944.

The Black Hawks faced the Detroit Red Wings in the 1961 Stanley Cup Finals. The Red Wings finished the season behind Chicago in the regular season, earning 66 points; however, they upset the heavily favored Toronto Maple Leafs to earn a spot in the finals. The Hawks took the series opener on home ice, as Bobby Hull scored two goals in Chicago's 3–2 win. The series moved to the Detroit Olympia for the second game, and the Red Wings responded with a 3–1 win to even the series up. The third game was back in Chicago, and it was the Hawks who took a 2–1 series lead by defeating the Red Wings 3–1; however, in the fourth game back in Detroit, the Red Wings evened the series up again, defeating the Hawks 2–1. Chicago easily won the fifth game in Chicago, winning 6–3 to take the series lead once again. In the sixth game in Detroit, the Black Hawks won the series as they handily defeated the Wings 5–1 to win their third Stanley Cup in team history, and the first since 1938. Pierre Pilote led all players in playoff scoring, earning 15 points, while Bobby Hull was just behind him with 14 points.

Chicago Black Hawks 4, Montreal Canadiens 2

Chicago Black Hawks 4, Detroit Red Wings 2

Player statistics

Regular season
Scoring leaders

Goaltending

Playoffs
Scoring leaders

Goaltending

Awards and records

Transactions

See also
 1960–61 NHL season

References

Sources
 Hockey-Reference
 Rauzulu's Street
 Goalies Archive
 National Hockey League Guide & Record Book 2007

Stanley Cup championship seasons
Chicago Blackhawks seasons
Chicago
Chicago